Booth capturing, or booth looting, is electoral fraud in which party loyalists or hired criminals "capture" a polling booth and vote in place of legitimate voters to ensure that a particular candidate wins. It is a form of voter suppression.

India 
It is a general rule in Indian elections that agents of every contesting candidates need to be present at the booth. However, they are in many areas threatened or assaulted and so leave the polling premises. The Election Commission of India has a general abbreviation that a section or half of one of Central Para Military Forces is enough to prevent incidents.

The first instance of booth capturing in India was recorded in the 1957 General Elections in Rachiyahi, in Begusarai District's Matihani assembly seat. The word came into prominent use in the media during the late 1970s and 1980s when the number of parties and candidates multiplied. This resulted in some Parties using underhand methods including booth capturing, especially in the rural India.

In 1989 the Representation of the People Act, 1951 was modified to include booth capturing as an offense punishable by law and countermanding or adjourning any poll that was booth captured. The development of the Electronic Voting Machine (EVM) was also intended to make it harder for booth capturers to stuff the ballot boxes with their votes by enabling a five-minute delay between each vote entered as against hundreds of votes in the same time using ballot papers (stamped by a group of 3–4). The EVMs also possess a "close" button which can be used by the polling officer to deactivate the machines. Despite this, booth capturing continues to happen, albeit at a much reduced rate.

Nepal 
Booth capturing was prevalent in the 1st Nepalese Constituent Assembly. Another election was required in 106 polling stations because of electoral fraud, which included booth capturing. Political parties have accused each other of booth capturing and demanded another election as recently as 2017.

See also
Corruption in India
Electoral reform in India

References

Bibliography 
Nedumpara, Jose (2004). Political Economy and Class Contradictions: A Study. New Delhi: Anmol.
Omvedt, Gail (1993). Reinventing Revolution: New Social Movements and the Socialist Tradition in India. Armonk: M.E. Sharpe.
(2005). "Poll Booth Rerun Infamy in Churulia." The Statesman (India). 29 September.
Shakder, S. L. (1992). The Law and Practice of Elections in India. Mumbai: National Publishing House.
Singh, Bhim (2002). Murder of Democracy in Jammu and Kashmir. New Delhi: Amand Niketan.

Further reading 

 

Electoral fraud in India
Political corruption in India
Elections in Bihar
Corruption in Uttar Pradesh
Voter suppression
Corruption in Bihar